Allégresse is the third studio album by American jazz composer Maria Schneider. The album was released in 2000 by Enja Records.

Track listing

Personnel

 Tim Ries – soprano saxophone, clarinet, flute, alto flute
 Charles Pillow – alto saxophone, soprano saxophone, clarinet, flute, piccolo, oboe, English horn
 Rich Perry – tenor saxophone, flute
 Rick Margitza – tenor saxophone, soprano saxophone, flute
 Scott Robinson – baritone saxophone, bass saxophone, flute, alto flute, clarinet, bass clarinet
 Tony Kadleck – trumpet, piccolo trumpet, flugelhorn
 Greg Gisbert – trumpet, flugelhorn
 Laurie Frink – trumpet, flugelhorn
 Ingrid Jensen – trumpet, flugelhorn
 Dave Ballou – trumpet, flugelhorn
 Keith O'Quinn – trombone
 Rock Ciccarone – trombone
 Larry Farrell – trombone
 George Flynn – bass trombone, contrabass trombone
 Ben Monder – guitar
 Frank Kimbrough – piano
 Tony Scherr – double bass
 Tim Horner – drums
 Jeff Ballard – percussion

References

External links
 Maria Schneider.com – Allegresse

2000 albums
Big band albums
Enja Records albums
Experimental big band albums
Maria Schneider (musician) albums